Peter Albert Neil Perrett (born 8 April 1952) is an English singer, songwriter, musician and record producer. He is the singer, rhythm guitarist and principal songwriter for the rock band the Only Ones.

Prior to forming the Only Ones, who were initially active between 1976 and 1982, Perrett formed England's Glory whose recordings were finally released in 1987. Following the break-up of the Only Ones, Perrett retreated from public life before forming the One in 1994. The Only Ones reformed in 2007, and Perrett released a solo album, How the West Was Won, in 2017. Humanworld, his second solo album was released on 7 June 2019.

Early years
Peter Albert Neil Perrett was born on 8 April 1952 in Camberwell, south London, Perrett's father was first a police officer in post-war Palestine and then a builder, and his mother was an Austrian Jew. Perrett boarded at Bancroft's School, from where he was expelled at the age of 15 for rebellious behaviour. He was again expelled from his next school, Haberdashers' Aske's Hatcham College, at age 16. He left home after that and learned how to support himself within the London drug scene.

Prior to forming the Only Ones, Perrett had recorded material with England's Glory in 1973. At that time, his singing style was so similar to Lou Reed's that it nearly led NME journalist Nick Kent to believe that he was listening to unreleased Velvet Underground material. Although the band did not officially release any material at the time, an album of demos was released in 1987 due to interest in Perrett's next band, the Only Ones.

Career
Perrett formed the Only Ones in 1976 with his wife Zena as manager. After self-releasing their debut single "Lovers of Today", the band signed a recording contract with CBS Records and released three studio albums: The Only Ones (1978), Even Serpents Shine (1979), and Baby's Got a Gun (1980), before breaking-up in 1982.

Perrett re-emerged in 1994 with a new band called the One. The band released their debut EP Cultured Palate via their manager's record label Dwarf Records, before signing to Demon Records and releasing their debut album Woke up Sticky in 1996. The band split up that same year, with Perrett disappearing again until April 2004 when he made an appearance on stage with the Libertines. He also appeared on stage with his sons Jamie and Peter Jr.'s band Love Minus Zero. Long hiatuses in his music career have been ascribed to his enduring struggles with heroin and crack cocaine addictions.

The Only Ones reunited in 2007, following the use of "Another Girl, Another Planet" in a Vodafone advertising campaign and a subsequent request to perform at the All Tomorrow's Parties festival in Minehead. The band first played a brief UK tour in April and June of that year, and then continued performing as far afield as Japan through 2009. Despite reports that the band was working on a new album and performing new songs live, including "Dreamt She Could Fly" and "Black Operations" (which the band played on Later... with Jools Holland), the band went on hiatus again without releasing any new material.

After the Only Ones performed in Japan in 2014 without their drummer Mike Kellie, a press release announced that Perrett would play a one-off solo date at the Trades Club in Hebden Bridge, West Yorkshire in January 2015. Perrett played the gig to good reviews with his two sons performing as the backing band.

In April 2017, Perrett announced his debut solo album, How the West Was Won, which was released on 30 June by the  Domino label. Also on Domino, a second solo album was released on 7 June 2019, titled Humanworld. The album was preceded by two official videos, "Once is Enough" and "I Want Your Dreams" in April 2019 and an audio only track titled, "Heavenly Day" in May the same year.

The release of Humanworld was accompanied by a UK tour, which included a reunion of the three remaining members of The Only Ones when Perrett appeared at Somers Town Festival in July 2019.

Personal life
At age 16, Perrett ran away with his girlfriend, Xenoulla "Zena" Kakoulli. They married in 1970. Zena is a clothing designer and was the manager of The Only Ones from 1977–1981. Both suffer from COPD (Chronic Obstructive Pulmonary Disease) as a result of drug abuse.

Perrett now lives in North London.

Discography
Solo
 How the West Was Won (2017)
   Humanworld  (2019)

The Only Ones

 The Only Ones (1978)
 Even Serpents Shine (1979)
 Baby's Got a Gun (1980)

The One
  Woke Up Sticky (1996)

References

External links
Peter Perrett Official Website
The Only Ones Official Website

1952 births
Living people
English male singers
English male singer-songwriters
English rock guitarists
People from Camberwell
The Only Ones members
Singers from London
Musicians from London
British alternative rock musicians
English punk rock singers
English punk rock guitarists
English new wave musicians
Male new wave singers
People educated at Bancroft's School
English male guitarists